Kenneth Carpenter (born September 21, 1949, in Tokyo, Japan) is a paleontologist.  He is the former director of the USU Eastern Prehistoric Museum and author or co-author of books on dinosaurs and Mesozoic life. His main research interests are armored dinosaurs (Ankylosauria and Stegosauria), as well as the Early Cretaceous dinosaurs from the Cedar Mountain Formation in eastern Utah.

Bibliography
 Kenneth Carpenter, (1999) Eggs, Nests, and Baby Dinosaurs: A Look at Dinosaur Reproduction (Life of the Past), Indiana University Press; . 
 ----- The Dinosaurs of Marsh and Cope (out of print). 
 Kenneth Carpenter (Editor), Philip J. Currie (Editor) (1992) Dinosaur Systematics: Approaches and Perspectives Cambridge University Press, Paperback  ; Hardcover (1990) 
 Kenneth Carpenter (Editor), Karl F. Hirsch (Editor), John R. Horner (Editor),  (1994) Dinosaur Eggs and Babies, Cambridge University Press  ; Paperback 
 The Upper Jurassic Morrison Formation - an Interdisciplinary Study - Results of a Symposium held at the Denver Museum of Natural History, May 26–28, 1994,  Guest Editors: Kenneth Carpenter, Daniel J. Chure, and James I. Kirkland.,  Modern Geology, Volumes 22 and 23.  
 J. D. Lees, Marc Cerasini, Kenneth Carpenter, Alfonsi (1998) The Official Godzilla Compendium''. Random House (Merchandising); 
Acrocanthosaurus: Inside and Out

American paleontologists
Paleozoologists
1949 births
Living people
American taxonomists
University of Colorado Boulder alumni
20th-century American zoologists
21st-century American zoologists
People from Tokyo